Seguenzia triteia is a species of very small, deep water sea snail, a marine gastropod mollusc in the family Seguenziidae.

Description
The length of the shell attains 3.3 mm.

Distribution
This species occurs in the Atlantic Ocean off South-east Brazil.

References

Seguenzia
Gastropods described in 2014